Percival Landing Park is a public park located in Olympia, Washington.

History 

Named after a former commercial steamship wharf, the park is a well-known maritime landmark in the Pacific Northwest. Built by Sam Percival in 1860, the wharf operated for several decades, and was torn down and replaced several times during that period.

The first phase of Percival Landing Park was completed and opened in 1977, with the second phase opened in 1985, and the third phase in 1988. The former Unocal Tank Farm site was acquired by the City of Olympia in 1996, and is now an open lawn.

Features 

Today the park features picnic areas, public art, boat moorage and a playground. The park features a  boardwalk extends along the eastern shoreline of the West Bay of Budd Inlet from the Fourth Avenue Bridge to Thurston Avenue. The park features a carved Orca by Olympia artist Joe Tougas, who competed an identical work for Yashiro, Japan, Olympia's sister city.

There are several events held annually at Percival Landing Park, including Harbor Days and "Sand in the City", as well as the Wooden Boat Festival.

See also 
History of Olympia, Washington

References

External links 

Harbor Days official website

History of Olympia, Washington
Parks in Olympia, Washington